A tongue depressor (sometimes called spatula) is a tool used in medical practice to depress the tongue to allow for examination of the mouth and throat. The most common modern tongue depressors are flat, thin, wooden blades, smoothed and rounded at both ends, but, historically, tongue depressors have been made of a variety of materials. Since they are inexpensive and difficult to clean because of their porous texture, wooden tongue depressors are labeled for disposal after a single usage.

Hobbyists, artists, and teachers use tongue depressors (sometimes called "craft sticks" or "popsicle sticks") in sculptural projects. 

Earlier versions of depressors were made from balsa, pine, or redwood woods. Tongue depressors made from wood and metal exist from the American Civil War.

References

External links
 VCU Libraries Medical Artifacts Collection: Tongue Depressors 

Medical equipment
Tongue